Phanom Dong Rak is the southwesternmost district (amphoe) of Surin province, northeastern Thailand.

History
The area was separated from Kap Choeng district and made a minor district (king amphoe) on 1 April 1995.

On 15 May 2007, all 81 minor districts were upgraded to full districts. On 24 August the upgrade became official.

Geography
Neighboring districts are (from the west clockwise): Ban Kruat of Buriram province; Prasat, Kap Choeng of Surin Province; and Oddar Meancheay of Cambodia.

The district is in the Phanom Dong Rak Range, the hills that form a boundary between Thailand and Cambodia. The name of the district translates as 'Dongrak Mountains'.

Administration
The district is divided into four sub-districts (tambons), which are further subdivided into 55 villages (mubans). There are no municipal (thesaban) areas. There are four tambon administrative organizations (TAO).

References

External links
amphoe.com

Phanom Dong Rak
Dângrêk Mountains